Colonel Donnie Thomas was the commander of Joint Task Force Guantanamo's Joint Detention Group from February 2010 to June 2012.

In December 2011 the public learned about Camp Five Echo, a previously secret camp, for non-compliant detainees were kept in isolation.
According to Thomas the conditions at the camp met the minimum standards, so they weren't inhumane.

In June 2012 Michael Isikoff, of NBC News, interviewed Thomas about recently announced improvements to the detainees' conditions of detention.

In March 2013 it became known that the interview rooms where attorneys met with Guantanamo clients were fitted with listening devices.
Thomas's successor, John Bogdan, testified that he was not aware the rooms were bugged, while Thomas testified he was aware.
Colonel Thomas Welsh, Joint Task Force Guantanamo's Legal Advisor, described asking Thomas for an explanation when he observed a law enforcement agent  monitoring a meeting between other law enforcement officials, prosecutors, defense attorneys and a detainee-client at Camp Echo II.

References

United States Army colonels
Guantanamo Bay detention camp
Year of birth missing (living people)
Living people